Broadway and Home is a 1920 American silent drama film directed by Alan Crosland and starring Eugene O'Brien, Elinor Fair and Warren Cook.

Cast
 Eugene O'Brien as Michael Strange 
 Elinor Fair as Mary Bruce 
 Warren Cook as John Stephens 
 Frank Losee as Paul Grayson 
 Ellen Cassidy as Laura Greer

References

Bibliography
 Monaco, James. The Encyclopedia of Film. Perigee Books, 1991.

External links

1920 films
1920 drama films
Silent American drama films
Films directed by Alan Crosland
American silent feature films
American black-and-white films
Selznick Pictures films
1920s American films